Fofo may refer to:

 .44 Magnum, a gun cartridge
 Adolfo Enríquez García (b. 1990), Spanish footballer known as Fofo.
 Ford Focus
 Egidio Armelloni (b. 1909), Italian gymnast nicknamed Fofò
 A character from the puzzle game Baba Is You